Peter Graham Faithfull Henderson,  (1 October 1928 – 25 September 2016) was an Australian senior public servant. He was Secretary of the Department of Foreign Affairs between 1979 and 1984. He was also well known for being the son-in-law of Robert Menzies.

Early life and marriage
Henderson was born in October 1928. He was educated at Geelong Grammar School, Victoria, and Merton College, Oxford (1947-1950). In May 1955, Henderson married Heather Menzies, daughter of Robert Menzies, the Australian Prime Minister. They had their first child, a daughter, in March 1956, in Jakarta.

Career and later life
Henderson began his career in the Australian Public Service in the Department of External Affairs in 1951.

He was appointed Secretary of the Department of Foreign Affairs in 1979. During his time at the department he introduced rules to prevent couples being posted together, which was interpreted by those it affected as a "pincer movement" against career equality for female diplomats.

At the end of his public service career in September 1984, Henderson was offered the choice of a demotion or retirement—he chose to retire, and denounced the Australian Government for using the diplomatic service as a "depository... for people they want to get rid of in Canberra".

Henderson died in Canberra on 25 September 2016.

Awards
In January 1985, Henderson was made a Companion of the Order of Australia in recognition of distinguished public service.

Notes

References and further reading

1928 births
2016 deaths
Ambassadors of Australia to the Philippines
Australian public servants
Companions of the Order of Australia
Alumni of Merton College, Oxford